"S' Opoion Areso" is a song by Greek singer Katy Garbi featuring Phoebus. It was released on digital platforms on 2 October 2020 by Panik Platinum, a sub-label of Panik Records, as the fourth single from her upcoming twenty-first studio album.

The music video of "S' Opoion Areso" directed by George Gavalos, premiered on 15 October 2020. The video is themed on embracing differences.

Credits and personnel
Credits adapted from YouTube.

 Katy Garbi – lead vocals and backing vocals
 Phoebus and Vasilis Nikolopoulos – programming and composition
 Giorgos Hatzopoulos – guitar
 Giorgos Roilos – percussion
 Thanasis Petrelis – Irban, Tziran, Taar, Dobra
 Akis Deiximos – backing vocals
 Haris Galanis, Savvas Galanis, Akis Deiximos, Fotis Papazisis, Chrysa Pandeli, Angelina Koutouraki, Christina Ralli – vocals
 Vangelis Siapatis – sound engineering
 Vassilis Nikolopoulos – sound mixing

Charts
"S' Opoion Areso" debuted on the Cyprus Top 20 Combined Airplay Chart at number 20 upon its release, peaking at number 11. The single debuted on the Top 20 Greek Official IFPI Airplay Chart at number 20, peaking at number 14.

Weekly charts

Year-end charts

Release history

References

Katy Garbi songs
2020 songs